ゆ, in hiragana or ユ in katakana, is one of the Japanese kana, which each represents one mora. Both the hiragana and katakana forms are written in two strokes and represent the sound .

When small and preceded by an -i kana, this kana represents a palatalization of the preceding consonant sound with the  vowel (see yōon).

Stroke order

Other communicative representations

 Full Braille representation

 The yōon characters ゅ and ュ are encoded in Japanese Braille by prefixing "-u" kana (e.g. Ku, Su) with a yōon braille indicator, which can be combined with the "Dakuten" or "Handakuten" braille indicators for the appropriate consonant sounds.

 Computer encodings

References

The Compact Nelson Japanese-English Character Dictionary (Andrew Nelson, John H Haig) Tuttle Publishing 1999

Specific kana